The Whitesburg Formation is a dark limestone with interbedded shales geologic formation in Tennessee and Virginia. It preserves fossils dating back to the Ordovician period.

History
The Whitesburg Formation was formally proposed in 1930, though E.O. Ulrich had used the name prior to the formal proposal. The Whitesburg formation was later downgraded to the Whitesburg limestone, and was considered a basal member of the Blockhouse Shale. The Whitesburg Formation was then elevated back to formation status with the Fetzer member assigned as the basal member. The Fetzer is not considered to be a continuous body of rock, and exists in the Whitesburg formation as lenses.

See also

 List of fossiliferous stratigraphic units in Tennessee
 List of fossiliferous stratigraphic units in Virginia
 Paleontology in Tennessee
 Paleontology in Virginia

References

 

Ordovician geology of Tennessee
Ordovician geology of Virginia
Ordovician southern paleotemperate deposits